Francesca Bradamante (born 26 April 1973) is a former Italian female high jumper.

Biography
Bradamante won one national championships at senior level, her personal best 1.95 m, set in Udine 1998, is the 6th best Italian performance of all-time. In 1998 her measure was also the 10th world best performance of the year in the IAAF season's lists.

National titles
Italian Athletics Championships
High jump: 1998

See also
Italian all-time top lists - High jump

References

External links
 

1973 births
Living people
Italian female high jumpers